Pablo Canavosio (born 26 December 1981 in Córdoba, Argentina) is an Italian Argentine rugby union footballer. Canavosio played for Rovigo, Calvisano, Castres Olympique and Aironi. His usual position is at scrum half or wing.

He made his international debut in June 2005, as a substitute against  in Melbourne. He started in all Italy's games in the 2006 Six Nations Championship, was a replacement in two 2007 Rugby World Cup - Europe qualification matches (in which he scored three tries) and started in the 2006 Autumn internationals against Australia and Argentina. Canavosio played only once during the 2007 Rugby World Cup, against . He was selected in Italy's squad for the 2008 Six Nations Championship and the 2009 Six Nations Championship. Pablo was selected in Italy's squad for the 2010 Six Nations Championship and he scored a late try as a substitute for Italy in their loss to France. He also played at the 2011 Rugby World Cup.

External links
RBS 6 Nations profile
Pablo Canavosio on ercrugby.com
Scrum profile

1981 births
Living people
Sportspeople from Córdoba, Argentina
Argentine rugby union players
Italian rugby union players
Italian sportspeople of Argentine descent
Rugby union scrum-halves
Rugby union wings
Italy international rugby union players